The NWA "Beat the Champ" Television Championship was a secondary professional wrestling singles title defended in Johnny Doyle's NWA Los Angeles from 1951 to 1959. The title was defended in the same area during the 1960s under promoters Gene and Mike LeBell.

Title history
An  indicates that a title changes occurred no later than the listed date.

See also
SMW Beat the Champ Television Championship, which operated under a similar system in the 1990s

References

General

Specific

External links
N.W.A. "Beat the Champ" Television Title (Los Angeles)

National Wrestling Alliance championships
NWA Hollywood Wrestling championships
Regional professional wrestling championships